Anything Goes is the debut studio album by American country music singer Randy Houser. It was released on November 18, 2008 via Universal South Records. The album's lead-off single, its title track, reached number 16 on the US Billboard Hot Country Songs chart. The second single, "Boots On", peaked at number 2. Houser co-wrote all but three of the songs on the album.

"Back to God" was later recorded by Reba McEntire for her 2017 album Sing It Now: Songs of Faith & Hope, from which it was released as the second single.

Track listing

Personnel
Adapted from liner notes.

Cliff Audretch III – background vocals (track 3)
David Angell – strings (tracks 4, 5)
Nick Buda – drums (tracks 6, 7)
John Catchings – strings (tracks 4, 5)
J. T. Corenflos – electric guitar (all tracks), baritone guitar (track 5)
Eric Darken – percussion (all tracks except 7 & 10)
David Davidson – strings (tracks 4, 5)
Stuart Duncan – fiddle (track 11)
Kim Fleming – background vocals (tracks 2, 4)
Paul Franklin – steel guitar (all tracks except 6 & 7), dobro (track 11)
Vince Gill – background vocals (track 10)
Kenny Greenberg – electric guitar (tracks 8-11)
Vicki Hampton – background vocals (tracks 2, 4)
Wes Hightower – background vocals (all tracks except 6 & 10)
Randy Houser – lead vocals (all tracks), acoustic guitar (tracks 6, 8, 9)
Stephen Lamb – copyist (tracks 4, 5)
B. James Lowry – acoustic guitar (tracks 1-5), gut string guitar (track 5)
Steve Mackey – bass guitar (tracks 6, 7)
Aaron Mason – background vocals (tracks 2, 4)
Kevin McKendree – Wurlitzer electric piano (tracks 6, 7), Hammond B-3 organ (tracks 6, 7)
Rob McNelley – electric guitar (tracks 1-7)
Steve Nathan – piano (tracks 2, 4, 5, 8, 10, 11), Hammond B-3 organ (tracks 1, 3-5, 9)
Michael Rhodes – bass guitar (all tracks except 6 & 7)
Bryan Sutton – acoustic guitar (track 11)
Bruce Wallace – acoustic guitar (tracks 6, 7)
Kristin Wilkinson – string arrangements (tracks 4, 5), strings (tracks 4, 5)
John Willis – acoustic guitar (tracks 8-11)
Lonnie Wilson – drums (all tracks except 6 & 7)

Charts

Weekly charts

Year-end charts

References

2008 debut albums
Randy Houser albums
Show Dog-Universal Music albums
Albums produced by Mark Wright (record producer)